Events from the year 1805 in Denmark.

Incumbents
 Monarch – Christian VII
 Prime minister – Christian Günther von Bernstorff

Events

Births
 1 January – Fritz Petzholdt, painter (died 1838)
 2 April – Hans Christian Andersen, writer of plays, travelogues, novels, poems and fairy tales (died 1875)
 14 May – Johan Peter Emilius Hartmann, composer (died 1900)
 21 August – August Bournonville, ballet master and choreographer (died 1879)

Deaths
 7 December – Frederick, Hereditary Prince of Denmark (born 1753)

References

 
1800s in Denmark
Denmark
Years of the 19th century in Denmark